Polyhymno colleta is a moth of the family Gelechiidae. It was described by Walsingham in 1911. It is found in Mexico (Guerrero).

The wingspan is 11–12 mm. The forewings are ivory-white, the dorsal third mottled with brown, which forms also a broken line along the fold, furcate near its outer end, the point running toward the apex. A rather broad brown band occurs along the costa, a slender white line running through it from before the middle of the costa to its outer and lower extremity. This is followed by a broader oblique white streak from the commencement of the costal cilia, nearly meeting the end
of the slender white line below it. A pair of shorter, triangular, geminated streaks, the outer pair in the apical cilia separated by brown on the costa, the same colour running outward below them and forming a caudate apex in the cilia. Preceding the termen and parallel to it are a few silvery metallic scales the terminal cilia being ornamented by two black spots in a white patch, margined before by brown, and behind by brownish grey. The dorsal cilia is brownish grey. The hindwings are pale bluish grey.

References

Moths described in 1911
Polyhymno